Coggiola is a comune (municipality) in the Province of Biella in the Italian region Piedmont, located about  northeast of Turin and about  northeast of Biella.
 
Coggiola borders the following municipalities: Ailoche, Caprile, Portula, Pray.

The municipal territory houses the sanctuaries of Cavallero and Moglietti.

Twin towns — sister cities
Coggiola is twinned with:

  La Fare-les-Oliviers, France

References